WJNJ (1320 AM) is a commercial radio station in Jacksonville, Florida.  It is owned by New Covenant Ministries, Inc., and airs an urban gospel radio format.  Its schedule is a mix of contemporary gospel hits and preaching shows aimed at the African-American community.  Weekday mornings, it carries the Erica Campbell Show, syndicated from Radio One.

WJNJ broadcasts with 16,000 watts by day using a non-directional antenna.  But at night, to avoid interfering with other stations on AM 1320, it greatly drops its power to 80 watts and uses a directional antenna.  It uses a non-directional antenna at all times.  Listeners can also hear WJNJ’s programming on 103.7 MHz via FM translator station W279AG in Atlantic Beach, Florida.

History
The station was first licensed on July 23, 1940 as WJHP on 1290 kHz. It was owned by The Metropolis Company and transmitted with a power output of 250 watts, and the call sign was derived from the initials of company president John H. Perry. By 1941, WJHP was an NBC Blue Network affiliate. Following the NARBA treaty, WJHP obtained a construction permit for the 1320 kHz frequency in March 1941, and the license was officially modified for the station to broadcast on 1320 beginning November 6, 1942.

The station was transferred to the Jacksonville Journal Company in 1952. In 1957, the Jacksonville Journal Company sold WJHP to Radio Jax for $225,000.

On June 6, 1968, WJHP's call sign changed to WVOJ. Four days later, the station was acquired by Victory Broadcasting, which changed the station to a country music format. Its slogan was "The Voice of Jacksonville". By 1976, WVOJ became the most popular radio station in Jacksonville.

WVOJ was purchased by Jacor on June 1, 1984 and changed its call sign to WQIK. On April 1, 1994, WQIK became WJGR. WJGR switched callsigns to WBOB on March 1, 2007; WBOB became WJNJ on May 3, 2010.

References

External links
PureRadioJax

JNJ
Gospel radio stations in the United States